Sorgho, Kentucky, originally named and known as Sorghotown, the boundaries of this unincorporated community were described in an order dated 12 May 1874, by Daviess County, Kentucky Judge Triplett, worded as follows: " Upon the application of ten voters to be effected by the change hereinafter specified; and it appearing to the Court right and proper that said change should be made; and further that the requirements of the law as to notice before application has been complied with, – it is therefore ordered that an additional voting precinct be and the same is hereby established in Daviess County (Kentucky), in District No. 1, to be called and known as 'Sorghotown Voting Place'...."  The community was named for the Daviess County Sorgho Sugar Company which was formed there in 1868–'69 by Dr. J. Q. A. Stewart, J. Balee and E. Guthrie. that organized there in the winter of 1868–69 for the manufacturing of sorghum sugar.  Once the factory was established the community began to develop.

Demographics

References

Unincorporated communities in Daviess County, Kentucky
Unincorporated communities in Kentucky